Pierre Berbizier (born 17 June 1958) is a French former rugby union footballer and a current coach. His usual position was at scrum-half. He played 56 times for France.

Biography
Berbizier was born in Saint-Gaudens. He made his international debut for France as a 22-year-old on 17 January 1981 in a test during the Five Nations against Scotland in Paris, which France won 16 points to nine. He played in the remaining Five Nations matches that season; earning caps against Ireland, Wales and England. He was capped  twice more after the Five Nations that year, in two matches against the All Blacks, which France lost.

He was capped twice the following year; once during the Five Nations against Ireland in Paris, which France won 22 points to nine, and then against Romania in Bucharest, which France lost. He played in two Five Nations matches in 1983, and one the following year. Appearing just once in the 1984 Five Nations, he was then capped twice against the All Blacks in Christchurch and Auckland, both of which the All Blacks won. He played twice for France in 1985; in a two test series against Argentina.

After appearing for France on various occasions throughout the early 1980s, he was capped 11 times during the 1986 season; including all the Five Nations matches, as well as three games against the All Blacks. The following season he led France to a grand slam victory at the 1987 Five Nations. 1987 was also the year of the first-ever Rugby World Cup, in which France were invited to compete, as they were an IRFB member. France played Scotland in the first World Cup match, drawing 20-all in Christchurch. he led them to subsequent victories over Romania and Fiji, which saw them enter the finals, defeating the Wallabies in a classic semifinal encounter 30–24 to enter the first World Cup final. They went down to hosts, the All Blacks, 29–9 at Eden Park. His last cap for France was at Twickenham on 16 March 1991. In 1992 he became the head coach of France, and led them to the semi-finals at the 1995 Rugby World Cup. He was sacked after falling out with French Federation president Bernard Lapasset.

He went on to coach at Narbonne, and since worked as a television pundit. Berbizier took over from John Kirwan to coach Italy. Under Berbizier, Italy for the first time won two matches in a single Six Nations edition in 2007 when they defeated Scotland 37–17 at Murrayfield and Wales 23–20 at Stadio Flaminio in Rome. He resigned as national team coach following the 2007 Rugby World Cup to take up the head coaching position at Racing Métro.

External links
Pierre Berbizier on sporting-heroes.net
Italians name Berbizier as coach

1958 births
Living people
People from Saint-Gaudens, Haute-Garonne
French rugby union players
French rugby union coaches
Rugby union scrum-halves
University of Cape Town alumni
France international rugby union players
France national rugby union team coaches
Italy national rugby team coaches
Racing 92 coaches
Sportspeople from Haute-Garonne
SU Agen Lot-et-Garonne players
FC Lourdes players